Composers who have made significant contributions to the repertory of Anglican church music.

A
Malcolm Archer
Thomas Armstrong
Thomas Attwood
Richard Ayleward

B
Edgar Bainton
Edward Bairstow
John Barnard
Joseph Barnby
Adrian Batten
Jonathan Battishill
Lennox Berkeley
William Thomas Best
Elway Bevin
Hugh Blair
John Blow
William Boyce
Harry Bramma
David Briggs
Benjamin Britten
Albertus Bryne
William Byrd

C
Anthony Caesar
Jeremiah Clarke
Benjamin Cooke
Henry Cooke
Robert Cooke
Joseph Corfe
William Croft
William Crotch

D
Harold Darke
John Albert Delany
Richard Dering
James Douglas 
Jonathan Dove
Thomas Sanders Dupuis
George Dyson

F
Richard Farrant
Gerald Finzi

G
Henry Gadsby
Bernard Gates
Orlando Gibbons
John Goss
Maurice Greene

H
Peter Hallock
Calvin Hampton
George Frideric Handel
William H. Harris
Basil Harwood
William Henry Havergal
Philip Hayes
William Hayes
Edward John Hopkins
Martin How
Herbert Howells
Pelham Humfrey
Peter Hurford

I
John Ireland
Grayston Ives

J
Enderby Jackson
Francis Jackson
William Jackson of Exeter
William Jackson of Masham
Roger Jones
John Joubert

K
James Kent
Charles King
Gerald Knight

L
Craig Sellar Lang
Kenneth Leighton

M
John Merbecke
George William Martin
William Mathias
J. H. Maunder
E. J. Moeran
Thomas Morley
Herbert Murrill

N
Peter Nardone
James Nares
Sydney Nicholson
T. Tertius Noble

O
George Oldroyd
Frederick Ouseley

P
Frederick Augustus Packer
Hubert Parry
Osbert Parsley
Robert Parsons
Walter Porter
Francis Pott
Daniel Purcell
Henry Purcell

R
Vaughan Richardson
Alan Ridout
Sir John Rogers, 6th Baronet
Barry Rose
Bernard Rose
John Rutter

S
John Sanders
Martin Shaw
Richard Shephard
John Sheppard
Caleb Simper
Henry Smart
William Smith
Leo Sowerby
John Stainer
Charles Villiers Stanford
Charles Steggall
Charles Edward Stephens
Charles Hylton Stewart
Herbert Sumsion

T
Thomas Tallis
John Tavener
John Taverner
Thomas Tomkins
George William Torrance
John Travers
Noël Tredinnick
James Turle
William Turner
Christopher Tye

V
Stanley Vann
Ralph Vaughan Williams
Charles Garland Verrinder

W
Thomas Attwood Walmisley
William Walton
Thomas Weelkes
John Weldon
Samuel Wesley 
Samuel Sebastian Wesley
Alfred Wheeler
Healey Willan
Michael Wise
Charles Wood
Richard Woodward

See also
List of Anglicans and Episcopalians

Lists of composers
Composers
Lists of performers of Christian music
Composers